"Datenshi" (堕 天使) is the thirty-ninth single from the Japanese rock band Buck-Tick. It was released on January 29, 2020, by the label Lingua Sounda in three editions: a regular edition and two limited editions. The main track, "Datenshi", in a different version, is on the album Abracadabra.

Production 
The limited edition cover was created by Aquirax Uno and the regular edition cover is designed by Kazunori Akita and photographed by Yosuke Komatsu.

Charts 
Datenshi peaked at the sixth place on the Oricon charts.

Track listing

Personnel 
 Atsushi Sakurai - singing
 Hisashi Imai - lead guitar
 Hidehiko Hoshino - rhythm guitar
 Yutaka Higuchi - bass
 Yagami Toll - drums

Production 
 Kazunori Akita - art design
 Aquirax Uno - limited edition cover

References

External links
 

Buck-Tick songs
Japanese-language songs
2020 singles
2020 songs
Songs with lyrics by Atsushi Sakurai
Songs with music by Hisashi Imai